Marcus Annius Verus ( 50 – 138 AD) was the paternal grandfather and adoptive father of the Roman Emperor Marcus Aurelius, and father-in-law of emperor Antoninus Pius.

Biography
Verus was the son of an elder Marcus Annius Verus, who gained the rank of senator and praetor. His family originated from Uccibi (modern Espejo) near Corduba (modern Córdoba) in the Roman province of Hispania Baetica. The family came to prominence and became wealthy through olive oil production in Spain. He was close friends with the emperor Hadrian.

He was urban prefect of Rome and was enrolled as a patrician when Vespasian and Titus were censors. Verus was three times consul, the first time as a suffect in 97, then as ordinary consul in both 121 and 126. This is apparently the cause for a "very strange inscription, found on a large marble tablet excavated in the sixteenth century at St. Peter's in Rome" which alludes to this achievement while celebrating his skill "playing with a glass ball". Edward Champlin notes it was likely the creation of a friendly rival, Lucius Julius Ursus Servianus, who also held the consulate three times the last after Verus. 

He died in 138, nearly aged ninety. Marcus Aurelius says in his "Meditations": "From my grandfather Verus, [I learned] a kindly disposition and sweetness of temper". In his elder years, he had a mistress, of whom he expresses gratitude that "I wasn’t raised by my grandfather's mistress for longer than I was".

Family 
Verus married Rupilia Faustina (fl. 90 AD), a daughter of the consul Libo Rupilius Frugi and probably Vitellia Galeria Fundania, daughter of emperor Vitellius. Frugi also had another daughter named Rupilia who was the grandniece of emperor Trajan. Verus had at least three children by Faustina: 
 Annia Galeria Faustina or Faustina the Elder, a future empress, who married the future emperor Antoninus Pius
 Marcus Annius Libo, consul in 128
 Marcus Annius Verus, father to future emperor Marcus Aurelius

Ronald Syme suggests, based on onomastic evidence, that they had a fourth child, a daughter Annia, who married Gaius Ummidius Quadratus Sertorius Severus.

After Verus the son died in 124, the elder Verus adopted, and, together with his daughter-in-law Domitia, raised their children.

References

External links 

 
 
 
 
 
 

50s births
138 deaths
1st-century Roman consuls
2nd-century Roman consuls
Verus, Marcus
Nerva–Antonine dynasty
Suffect consuls of Imperial Rome
Urban prefects of Rome